During March 2023, two large banks in the United States with significant exposure to the technology sector or to cryptocurrency failed, while another entered liquidation under financial distress.  

By March 16, large interbank flows of funds were occurring to shore up bank balance sheets and numerous analysts were reporting on a more general U.S. banking crisis. Many banks had invested their reserves in U.S. Treasury securities, which had been paying low interest rates. As the Federal Reserve began raising rates in 2022, bond prices declined decreasing the market value of bank capital reserves, leading some banks to sell the bonds at steep losses as yields on new bonds were much higher. Eleven of the largest U.S. banks provided up to $30 billion to support the teetering San Francisco-based First Republic regional bank, and the Federal Reserve's discount window liquidity facility had experienced approximately $150 billion in borrowing from various banks by March 16.

The first bank to fail, cryptocurrency-focused Silvergate Bank, announced it would wind down on March 8 due to losses suffered in its loan portfolio. Two days later, upon announcement of an attempt to raise capital, a bank run occurred at Silicon Valley Bank, causing it to collapse and be seized by regulators that day. Signature Bank, a bank that frequently did business with cryptocurrency firms, was closed by regulators two days later on March 12, with regulators citing systemic risks. The collapses of Silicon Valley Bank and Signature Bank were the second- and third-largest bank failures in the history of the United States, smaller only than the 2008 collapse of Washington Mutual during the global financial crisis.

In response to banking failures, the Federal Reserve Board of Governors, Federal Deposit Insurance Corporation, and the United States Department of the Treasury announced in a joint communiqué that extraordinary measures would be taken to ensure that all deposits at Silicon Valley Bank and Signature Bank would be honored, with the Federal Reserve separately announcing the creation of the Bank Term Funding Program (BTFP), a program that would offer loans of up to one year in length to banks, savings associations, credit unions, and other eligible depository institutions pledging U.S. Treasuries, agency debt and mortgage-backed securities, and other qualifying assets as collateral.

Background

Several large banks within the United States gained market exposure to cryptocurrency and cryptocurrency-related firms prior to and during the COVID-19 pandemic. Among these banks were Silvergate Bank, Silicon Valley Bank, and Signature Bank, which collapsed in March 2023.

Silvergate Bank
Silvergate Bank is a California-based bank that began operations in 1988 as a savings and loan association. In the 2010s, the bank began to provide banking services to players within the cryptocurrency market. The bank sought regulatory approval in the summer of 2014 to do business with cryptocurrency firms. The bank expanded the assets on its balance sheet significantly—doubling its assets in its 2017 fiscal year to $1.9 billion—by servicing cryptocurrency exchanges and other companies who were involved in the cryptocurrency business that could not secure financing from larger, more conservative banks. By the fourth quarter of 2022, 90% of the bank's deposits had become cryptocurrency-related, with over $1 billion in deposits being tied to Sam Bankman-Fried.

In addition to providing traditional banking services to its cryptocurrency clients, the bank operated as a clearinghouse for its banking clients; it involved itself in the business of resolving and settling transactions in real-time through its proprietary Silvergate Exchange Network. The network allowed a client to send payments in U.S. dollars from its accounts with Silvergate to those of another client of the bank without requiring an interbank wire transfer. Due to the relative quickness of the transaction settling achieved on Silvergate's network, a large number of cryptocurrency companies set up accounts with the bank to take advantage of Silvergate's quick transaction settling times.

Silicon Valley Bank

Silicon Valley Bank (SVB) was a commercial bank founded in 1983 and headquartered in Santa Clara, California. Until its collapse, SVB was the 16th largest bank in the United States and was heavily skewed toward serving companies and individuals from the technology industry. Nearly half of U.S. venture capital-backed healthcare and technology companies were financed by SVB. Companies such as Airbnb, Cisco, Fitbit, Pinterest, and Block, Inc. have been clients of the bank. In addition to financing venture-backed companies, SVB was well known as a source of private banking, personal credit lines, and mortgages to tech entrepreneurs. According to the FDIC, it had $209 billion in assets at the end of 2022.

Signature Bank
Signature Bank was a New York City-based bank founded in 2001. The bank began as a subsidiary of Bank Hapoalim that took on clients with assets of around $250,000, lending to small businesses based in New York City and in the surrounding metropolitan area. The bank provided financing within the multifamily residential rental housing market in the New York metropolitan area beginning in 2007, though it began to reduce its exposure to the market during the 2010s. By 2019, just over four-tenths of the value of the bank's loans were made to multifamily homeowners in the New York metropolitan area, comprising $15.8 billion of the bank's then-$38.9 billion in net loans.

Beginning in 2018, Signature Bank began to court customers in the cryptocurrency industry, securing hires that were experienced in the area with the goal of moving away from its dependence on real estate lending. The quantity of deposits held at the bank expanded significantly, with deposits increasing from about $36.3 billion at the end of the 2018 fiscal year to $104 billion by August 2022; that month, over one-quarter of the bank's deposits held were those of cryptocurrency companies. Its cryptocurrency-sector clients included large cryptocurrency exchange operators, such as Celsius Network and Binance. By early 2023, Signature Bank had become the second largest provider of banking services to the cryptocurrency industry—second only to Silvergate Bank.

In addition to providing traditional banking services to cryptocurrency clients, Signature Bank opened a proprietary payment network for use among its cryptocurrency clients. The payment network, Signet, had opened in 2019 for approved clients, and allowed the real-time gross settlement of fund transfers through the blockchain without third parties or transaction fees. By the conclusion of 2020, Signature Bank had 740 clients using Signet. The network continued to expand during the following years; both Coinbase and the TrueUSD dollar-pegged stablecoin had become integrated with Signet in 2022 and 2021, respectively.

Bank collapses

Silvergate Bank

Despite conducting the majority of its business with cryptocurrency companies, Silvergate's investment portfolio was fairly conservative; the company took large positions in mortgage-backed securities as well as U.S. bonds. These sorts of assets, while reliable to be paid-in-full through their maturity date, carry risks associated with changes in interest rates; there is an inverse relationship between the mark-to-market value of a bond and the bond's yield. As interest rates shot up during the 2021–2023 inflation surge, the mark-to-market price of these securities decreased significantly. When these losses are unrealized, this does not typically cause the bank to cease operating, as the bank will receive payment-in-full under the original terms of the bond. However, if forced to sell these securities at a lower mark-to-market price, the losses on these types of assets become realized, posing significant risks to the bank's ability to continue to operate.

Silvergate was hit with a bank run in the wake of the bankruptcy of FTX; deposits from cryptocurrency-related firms dropped by 68% at the bank, with the bank facing requests from its clients to withdraw upwards of $8 billion in deposits. As Silvergate did not have enough cash-on-hand to satisfy the deposit withdrawals, the bank began to sell its assets at a steep loss; the company realized a loss of $718 million on withdrawal-related asset sales in the fourth fiscal quarter of 2022 alone. The bank, in a public statement, said that it was solvent at the end of Q4 2022, with an asset sheet containing assets of $4.6 billion in cash and $5.6 billion in liquid debt securities, with $3.8 billion in deposit obligations. Silvergate faced tight financial constraints in the coming months, selling assets at a loss and borrowing $3.6 billion from the Federal Home Loan Bank of San Francisco to maintain its liquidity. Silvergate wrote in a regulatory filing on March 1 that the bank risked losing its status as a well-capitalized bank and that the bank faced risks relating to its ability to continue operating.

Facing continued losses from sales of securities at mark-to-market price, Silvergate released a public notice on March 8, 2023, saying that it would undergo voluntary liquidation and would return all deposited funds to their respective owners.

Silicon Valley Bank

Silicon Valley Bank recorded an increase of its deposit holdings during the COVID-19 pandemic, when the tech sector experienced a period of growth. In 2021, it purchased long-term Treasury bonds to capitalize on the increased deposits. However, the current market value of these bonds decreased as the Federal Reserve raised interest rates to curb the 2021–2023 inflation surge. Higher interest rates also raised borrowing costs throughout the economy and some Silicon Valley Bank clients started pulling money out to meet their liquidity needs. To raise cash to pay withdrawals by its depositors, SVB announced on March 8 that it had sold over US$21 billion worth of securities, borrowed US$15billion, and would hold an emergency sale of some of its treasury stock to raise US$2.25billion. The announcement, coupled with warnings from prominent Silicon Valley investors, caused a bank run as customers withdrew funds totaling US$42billion by the following day.

On March 10, 2023, as a result of the bank run, the California Department of Financial Protection and Innovation (DFPI) seized SVB and placed it under the receivership of the Federal Deposit Insurance Corporation (FDIC). The FDIC established a deposit insurance national bank, the Deposit Insurance National Bank of Santa Clara, to service insured deposits and announced that it would start paying dividends for uninsured deposits the following week; the dividends were funded by proceeds from the sale of SVB assets. Some 89 percent of the bank's US$172billion in deposit liabilities exceeded the maximum insured by the FDIC. Two days after the failure, the FDIC received exceptional authority from the Treasury and announced jointly with other agencies that all depositors would have full access to their funds the next morning. An initial auction of Silicon Valley Bank assets on the same day attracted a single bid, after PNC Financial Services and RBC Bank backed away from making offers. The FDIC rejected this offer and plans to hold a second auction to attract bids from major banks, now that the bank's systemic risk designation allows the FDIC to insure all deposits. The bank was later reopened as a newly organized bridge bank, Silicon Valley Bridge Bank, N. A.

Signature Bank

As cryptocurrency prices dropped significantly in 2022, particularly so after the collapse of cryptocurrency exchange FTX, depositors in Signature Bank began to withdraw deposits in the tune of billions of dollars; by the end of 2022, deposits in the bank totaled around $88.6 billion, down from $106.1 billion in deposits held at the beginning of the year—a time when over one-quarter of deposits were held by digital asset-related entities. Towards the end of 2022, Signature Bank cut business ties with cryptocurrency exchange Binance, seeking to reduce the bank's exposure to risk associated with the cryptocurrency market. According to Signature Bank board member Barney Frank, Signature Bank was hit with a multi-billion dollar bank run on Friday, March 10, with depositors expressing concern about cryptocurrency-related risks affecting the bank. Investor confidence in the bank was also badly shaken, and the bank's stock declined by 23% on that Friday—the day on which Silicon Valley bank collapsed—marking the then-largest single-day decline of the Signature Bank's value in its 22-year history.

On March 12, 2023, two days after the collapse of Silicon Valley Bank, Signature Bank was closed by regulators from the New York State Department of Financial Services in what is the third-biggest banking collapse in U.S. history. The bank proved unable to close a sale or otherwise bolster its finances before markets opened on Monday morning in order to protect its assets after customers began withdrawing their deposits in favor of bigger institutions, and shareholders of the bank lost all invested funds. The bank was placed under receivership by the FDIC, which immediately established Signature Bridge Bank, N.A. to operate its marketed assets to bidders.

Signature Bank had been under multiple federal investigations that were ongoing at the time of the bank's collapse regarding the rigor of its anti-money laundering measures. The U.S. Department of Justice had opened a criminal probe into whether the firm was performing due diligence when opening up new accounts and whether it was doing enough to detect and report potential criminal activity by its clients. The U.S. Securities and Exchange Commission had opened a separate, related civil probe.

On March 19, the New York Community Bank (NYCB) agreed to purchase around $38.4 billion in Signature's assets for $2.7 billion. Due to the deal, 40 Signature branches were rebranded to Flagstar Bank, one of NYCB's subsidiaries.

Federal response

Bank Term Funding Program
In response to the bank failures of March, the U.S. Federal Government took extraordinary measures to mitigate fallout across the banking sector. On March 12, Federal Reserve created the Bank Term Funding Program (BTFP), an emergency lending program providing loans of up to one year in length to banks, savings associations, credit unions, and other eligible depository institutions that pledge U.S. Treasuries, agency debt and mortgage-backed securities, and other qualifying assets as collateral. The program is designed to provide liquidity to financial institutions, following the collapse of Silicon Valley Bank and other bank failures, and to reduce the risks associated with current unrealized losses in the U.S. banking system that totaled over $600 billion at the time of the program's launch. Funded through the Deposit Insurance Fund, the program offers loans of up to one year to eligible borrowers who pledge as collateral certain types of securities including U.S. Treasuries, agency debt, and mortgage-backed securities. The collateral will be valued at par instead of open-market value, so a bank can borrow on asset values that have not been impaired by a series of interest rate hikes since 2022. The Federal Reserve also eased conditions at its discount window. The Department of the Treasury will make available up to $25billion from its Exchange Stabilization Fund as a backstop for the program.

In addition to working with their counterparts at the FDIC and U.S. Treasury to provide liquidity to banks through the BTFP, the Federal Reserve has begun to internally discuss implementing stricter capital reserve and liquidity requirements for banks with between $100 billion and $250 billion in assets on their balance sheets. A review of regulations affecting regional banks has been ongoing since 2022, as Federal Reserve vice chairman Michael Barr and other officials in the Biden Administration had become increasingly concerned about the risk posed to the financial system by the rapidly increasing size of regional banks.

Investigations
The collapse of Silicon Valley Bank itself has also spurred federal investigations from the U.S. Securities and Exchange Commission as well as the United States Department of Justice. Within the scope of both probes is the sales of stock made by senior officers of Silicon Valley Bank shortly before the bank failed, while the SEC's investigation also includes a review of past financial- and other risk-related disclosures made by Silicon Valley Bank to evaluate their accuracy and completeness.

Broader impact
Silvergate's public collapse soon spurred a bank run affecting banks that, like Silvergate, took deposits that were largely uninsured. Intense scrutiny and pressure was applied to these banks, like Signature Bank (which failed on Sunday, March 12) and First Republic Bank. Depositors began to move money en masse from smaller banks to larger banks. On Monday, March 13, shares of regional banks fell. Shares of First Republic Bank fell by 67%, and on March 16, it received a $30 billion lifeline in the form of deposits from a number of major U.S. banks on top of a $70 billion financing facility provided by JPMorgan Chase & Co. Western Alliance Bancorporation share price fell 47% and PacWest Bancorp was down 21% recovering after their trading was halted. Moody's downgraded its outlook on the U.S. banking system to negative, citing what it described as "rapid deterioration" of the sector's financial footing. It also downgraded the credit ratings of several regional banks, including Western Alliance, First Republic, Intrust Bank, Comerica, UMB Financial Corporation, and Zions Bancorporation.

U.S. President Joe Biden made a statement about the first three bank failures on March 13, and asserted that government intervention was not a bailout and that the banking system was stable.

The initial bank failures led to speculation on 13 March that the Federal Reserve could pause or halt rate hikes. Beginning on March 13, traders began modifying their strategies in the expectation that fewer hikes than previously expected will occur. Some financial experts suggested that the BTFP, combined with a recent practice of finding buyers who would cover all deposits, may have effectively removed the FDIC's $250,000 deposit insurance limit. However, Treasury Secretary Janet Yellen clarified that any guarantee beyond that limit would need the approval of the Biden administration and Federal regulators.

The initial three bank failures and resulting pressures on other U.S. regional banks and were expected to reduce available financing in the commercial real estate market and further slow commercial property development. The Federal Reserve's discount window liquidity facility saw around $150 billion in borrowing from various banks by March 16, more than 12 times the $12 billion that the BTFP provided.

There were multiple banks that also ran into significant liquidity issues but did not initially fail by 16 March, such as First Republic Bank and Credit Suisse. Unlike the first three banks, these banks faced trouble despite not primarily dealing in the technology or cryptocurrency sectors.

By 16 March, large inter-bank flows of funds were occurring to shore up bank balance sheets and numerous analysts were reporting on a more general U.S. banking crisis. Many banks had invested their reserves in U.S. Treasury securities, which had been paying low interest rates. As the Federal Reserve began raising rates in 2022, bond prices declined decreasing the market value of bank capital reserves, leading some banks to sell the bonds at steep losses as yields on new bonds were much higher. Eleven of the largest U.S. banks are providing up to $30 billion to support the teetering San Francisco-based First Republic regional bank, and the Federal Reserve's discount window liquidity facility had experienced approximately $150 billion in borrowing from various banks by March 16.

On 17 March, President Biden stated that the banking crisis had calmed down, while the New York Times said that the March banking crisis was hanging over the economy and had rekindled fear of recession as business borrowing would become more difficult as many regional and community banks would have to reduce lending.

By Sunday, March 19, the banking crisis became global. The acquisition was supported by a  short term loss guarantee from the Swiss government and $100 billion of liquidity from the Swiss National Bank.

Also on Sunday, S&P downgraded the credit rating of First Republic Bank further into junk by three notches saying it "may not solve the substantial business, liquidity, funding, and profitability challenges that we believe the bank is now likely facing." 

Late on Sunday the Federal Reserve and several other central banks announced significant USD liquidity measures in order to calm market turmoil.
In a "coordinated action to enhance the provision of liquidity through the standing U.S. dollar swap line arrangements", the U.S. Federal Reserve, the Bank of Canada, Bank of Japan, European Central Bank and Swiss National Bank joined together to organize daily U.S. dollar swap operations. These swaps had previously been set up to occur on a weekly cadence.

See also
 Acquisition of Credit Suisse by UBS
 List of banks acquired or bankrupted in the United States during the 2007–2008 financial crisis

References

2023 in the United States
2023 in economics
2020s economic history
Bank failures in the United States
Economic history of California
Economic history of New York (state)
Financial markets
March 2023 events in the United States
Presidency of Joe Biden